Guilherme Alecsander Machado Guedes (born 18 May 1999), known as Guilherme Guedes, is a Brazilian footballer who plays as a left back.He currently plays for Juventude, on loan from Grêmio.

Career statistics

Club

Notes

Honours
Grêmio
Campeonato Gaúcho: 2020, 2021, 2022
Recopa Gaúcha: 2021

References

External links

1999 births
Living people
Footballers from Porto Alegre
Brazilian footballers
Association football defenders
Campeonato Brasileiro Série A players
Campeonato Brasileiro Série B players
Grêmio Foot-Ball Porto Alegrense players
Associação Atlética Ponte Preta players
Esporte Clube Juventude players